Castillo de Arena is a 1977 album, the last in a series of nine albums featuring flamenco guitarist Paco de Lucía and singer Camarón de la Isla. Paco de Lucia's brother Ramón de Algeciras also contributes guitar to the proceedings. The lyrics were written by Antonio Sánchez, with the exception of the bulerías "Samara" which was penned by both Sánchez and de la Isla. After this album, de Lucía turned his attentions to instrumental collaborations with jazz guitarists Larry Coryell, Al Di Meola and John McLaughlin, only returning to record again with Camarón on 1981's Como el Agua.

Track listing

References 
El Camaron De La Isla con la colaboración especial de Paco de Lucia – Castillo De Arena (1977, CD) 

1977 albums
Paco de Lucía albums
Camarón de la Isla albums